Kathputli  may refer to:

Kathputli (puppetry), a form of string marionette (puppet art) aboriginal to the Indian state of Rajasthan
 Kathputli (1957 film), 1957 Indian Hindi-language film starring Balraj Sahni and Vyjayanthimala
 Kathputli (1971 film), 1971 Indian Hindi-language film by Brij Sadanah, starring Jeetendra and Mumtaz
 Kathputli (TV series), 2016 Pakistani television series
 Cuttputlli (stylization of Kathputli), 2022 Indian thriller film by Ranjit M. Tewari